Changeland is a 2019 comedy-drama film written and directed by Seth Green.

It was released on June 7, 2019, by Gravitas Ventures.

Plot
While a troubled man goes through a personal crisis, he meets up with his estranged friend in Thailand.

Cast 
 Seth Green as Brandon
 Breckin Meyer as Dan
 Brenda Song as Pen
 Macaulay Culkin as Ian
 Clare Grant as Dory
 Randy Orton as Martin
 Rose Williams as Emma
 Kedar Williams-Stirling as Marc

Production 
The film was announced on June 21, 2017. It marks the feature directorial debut of Seth Green, who also stars in the film alongside Breckin Meyer, Macaulay Culkin, Brenda Song, Clare Grant, Rose Williams, Kedar Williams-Stirling and Randy Orton. Filming in Thailand began that same week. Patrick Stump, who composed the film score, has an uncredited cameo appearance as an airline passenger in the film's opening scene.

Release
In March 2019, Gravitas Ventures acquired distribution rights to the film and set it for a June 7, 2019 release.

Reception 
On Metacritic, it has a score of 42 out of 100, based on four critics.

References

External links 
 

2019 films
Films set in Thailand
Films shot in Thailand
2019 directorial debut films
2019 comedy-drama films
American comedy-drama films
2010s English-language films
2010s American films